Flanders and Swann were a British comedy duo and musicians. Michael Flanders (1922–1975) was a lyricist, actor, and singer. He collaborated with Donald Swann (1923–1994), a composer and pianist, in writing and performing comic songs. They first worked together in a school revue in 1939 and eventually wrote more than 100 comic songs together.

Between 1956 and 1967, Flanders and Swann performed their songs, interspersed with comic monologues, in their long-running two-man revues At the Drop of a Hat and At the Drop of Another Hat, which they toured in Britain and abroad. Both revues were recorded in concert (by George Martin). The duo also made several studio recordings.

Musical partnership
Flanders and Swann both attended Westminster School (where in July and August 1940 they staged a revue called Go To It) and Christ Church, Oxford, two institutions linked by ancient tradition. The pair went their separate ways during World War II, but a chance meeting in 1948 led to their forming a musical partnership writing songs and light opera. Flanders provided the words and Swann composed the music. Their songs have been sung by performers such as Ian Wallace and Joyce Grenfell.

In December 1956, Flanders and Swann hired the New Lindsey Theatre, Notting Hill, to perform their two-man revue At the Drop of a Hat, which opened on New Year's Eve. Flanders sang a selection of the songs that they had written, interspersed with comic monologues, accompanied by Swann on the piano. An unusual feature of their act was that both men remained seated for their shows: Swann behind his piano and Flanders in a wheelchair (having contracted poliomyelitis in 1943). The show was successful and transferred the next month to the Fortune Theatre, where it ran for over two years, before touring in the UK, the United States, Canada and Switzerland.

In 1963, Flanders and Swann opened in a second revue, At the Drop of Another Hat, at the Haymarket Theatre. Over the next four years they toured a combination of the two shows in the UK, Australia, New Zealand, Hong Kong, the United States and Canada, before finishing at the Booth Theatre on Broadway in New York City. On 9 April 1967, they performed their last live show together. Ten days later, they moved into a studio and recorded the show for television.

Over the course of 11 years, Flanders and Swann gave nearly 2,000 live performances. Although their performing partnership ended in 1967, they remained friends afterwards and collaborated on occasional projects.

Timeline and venues of the revues

Discography
Their records were originally released on the Parlophone label; CD reissues are on EMI.

45s
 1957 – "A Gnu" b/w "Misalliance"

EPs
 1957 – More out of the Hat! (EP)
 1959 – Excerpts from at the Drop of a Hat (EP)
 1959 – More Excerpts from at the Drop of a Hat (EP)
 1962 – The Bestiary of Flanders & Swann (EP)
 1964 – Favourites from at the Drop of Another Hat (EP)
 1964 – More out of the New Hat (EP)

LPs
 1957 – At the Drop of a Hat (50th performance and one a few days later, PMC 1033)
 1960 – At The Drop of a Hat (Final performance produced by George Martin)
 1964 – At the Drop of Another Hat (produced by George Martin)
 1967 – The Bestiary of Flanders & Swann (produced by George Martin)
 1975 – And Then We Wrote... 1977 – Tried by the Centre CourtCassettes
 1996 – EMI Comedy Classics (Hat and Another Hat on two cassettes)
 1997 – More out of the Drop of a Hat – Again! (double cassette)

CDs
 1991 – The Complete Flanders & Swann (first three albums in a boxed set)
 1994 – A Transport of Delight: The Best of Flanders & Swann 1999 – The Flanders and Swann Collection 2000 – A Drop of Hilarity from Flanders & Swann 2007 – Hat Trick: Flanders & Swann Collector's EditionBibliography
 1977 – Songs of Michael Flanders and Donald Swann (Michael Flanders & Donald Swann, scores)
 1991 – The Hippopotamus Song: A Muddy Love Story (Michael Flanders & Donald Swann, children's book)

Videography
 1992 – The Only Flanders & Swann Video (recorded New York, 19 April 1967, 10 days after the close of At The Drop of Another Hat)
 1998 – Flanders & Swann (recorded in New York, 1962 & 1967)

 Songs 
Flanders and Swann's songs are characterised by wit, gentle satire, complex rhyming schemes, and memorable choruses. Flanders commented during the recorded performance of At the Drop of Another Hat,

They wrote over a hundred comic songs together.  The following selection gives an indication of their range.

A very rare song, "Vendor Librorum Floreat" (Let the bookseller flourish), was released as a single in 1960. It was written for the annual American Booksellers Association, the only known time Flanders & Swann accepted a private commission.

 Monologues 
Flanders' comic monologues include:
 "By Air"—about the vogue for air travel. "I agree with the old lady who said, 'If God had intended us to fly, He would never have given us the railways.
 "Tried by the Centre Court"—a Wimbledon match between Miss L. Hammerfest and Miss Joan Hunter-Dunn, as told by an exasperated umpire. "They are bashing a ball with the gut of a cat".
 "Greensleeves"—about the background to the composition of the famous English air. An annotated version explains all the jokes.
 Los Olividados— a satire on bullfighting, about "the almost unbearable drama of a corrida d'olivas, or festival of olive-stuffing". "A cruel sport: some may think it so. But this is surely more than a sport, this is more than a vital artform. What we have experienced here today is total catharsis, in the acting out of that primeval drama, of man pitted against the olive." The title is a reference to Los Olvidados, or The Forgotten Ones, a 1950 movie by the director Luis Buñuel.
 "Built-up Area"—a prehistoric inhabitant of Salisbury Plain complains about a new development: Stonehenge.

Homage and parody
The British comedy double act Armstrong & Miller have a recurring sketch on The Armstrong and Miller Show'' in which they parody Flanders and Swann, as Donald Brabbins (Armstrong as Flanders) and Teddy Fyffe (Miller as Swann). The parodies begin like a typical Flanders and Swann performance, but the songs are far more bawdy, often being mock-censored for comedic effect.

British singer-songwriter Frank Turner covered "The Armadillo" in his "Mittens" EP.

See also
List of songwriter tandems
List of people educated at Westminster School

References

External links

 Flanders and Swann at h2g2
 Flanders & Swann Online (archived)
 An Evening of Flanders and Swann tribute act (archived)
 Flanders and Swann: At the Drop of a Hippopotamus tribute act

English comedy duos
Angel Records artists
British comedy musical groups
English musical duos
Parlophone artists
Musical groups established in 1956
1956 establishments in the United Kingdom